Ivan Cardoso (born 1952 in Rio de Janeiro) is a Brazilian filmmaker.

His peculiar style is called Terrir (a portmanteau in Portuguese of terror + rir= to laugh), a mix of classic horror fiction tropes, elements of popular Brazilian sexy chanchada comedy style, and parodies of the most widespread Brazilian stereotypes.

He also produced a documentary film about his friend and inspirator, José "Coffin Joe" Mojica Marins.

Selected filmography

 1970 - Nosferato no Brasil (Nosferatu in Brazil)
 1977 - O Universo de Mojica Marins
 1982 - O Segredo da Múmia
 1986 - As Sete Vampiras
 1990 - O Escorpião Escarlate (The Scarlet Scorpion) 
 2005 - Um Lobisomem na Amazônia (A werewolf in Amazon)
 2005 - A Marca do Terrir

References 

Brazilian film directors
1952 births
People from Rio de Janeiro (city)
Living people